Zhao Zhongshi, or Zhong Shi, was a prince of Nanyue.

He was a son of the Chinese mandarin Zhao Tuo, was sent as an emissary to the king of Âu Lạc, and was given the hand in marriage of Mỵ Châu, the only daughter of An Dương Vương. But she unwittingly betrayed her father to her husband's father, leading to the fall of Cổ Loa fortress to Zhao Tuo. In legend. An Dương Vương fled with his daughter. When he reached a river, he called out to the Golden turtle for help, to which the turtle surfaced and scolded him: “The one on horse behind [you] is the enemy? Why not kill [that one]?” So he killed her. Zhao Zhongshi arrived immediately afterward, and found the body of his beloved wife and his father-in-law nowhere to be seen, he brought her body back to Cổ Loa for burial and later on drowned himself in the well where his wife once bathed.

Zhao Zhongshi and Mỵ Châu in literature
Zhao Zhongshi and Mỵ Châu are a Romeo and Juliet motif in Vietnam's literature.

See also
 Nanyue
 Triệu dynasty
 Zhao Tuo
 Panyu District
 An Dương Vương
 Âu Lạc
 Baiyue

References

Nanyue
Suicides by drowning in China